Margaret Peear (born 1955) is an English former cricketer who played as a right-handed batter. She appeared in one One Day Internationals for England, against the West Indies on 6 June 1979, but did not bat or bowl. She played domestic cricket for East Anglia and Yorkshire.

References

External links
 
 

Date of birth missing (living people)
Living people
People from Surrey
England women One Day International cricketers
East Anglia women cricketers
Yorkshire women cricketers
1955 births